The Abra was an Italian motorcycle that was manufactured from 1923 to 1927. The Abra initially used a DKW 146cc two-stroke engine, but from 1924 132cc engines of the company's own design were used. Production was limited.

See also 

List of Italian companies
List of motorcycle manufacturers

References

External links
 1924 132cc Sport model

Defunct motor vehicle manufacturers of Italy
Defunct motorcycle manufacturers of Italy
Italian companies established in 1923